A Woman's Woman is a 1922 American silent drama film directed by Charles Giblyn and starring Mary Alden, Dorothy Mackaill and Holmes Herbert.

Cast
 Mary Alden as Densie Plummer
 Louise Lee as Harriet Plummer
 Dorothy Mackaill as Sally Plummer
 Holmes Herbert as John Plummer
 Albert Hackett as Kenneth Plummer
 Rod La Rocque as Dean Laddbarry
 Horace James as Sam Hippler
 Cleo Madison as Iris Starr
 Donald Hall as Rex Humberstone
 J. Barney Sherry as Senator James Gleason

References

Bibliography
 Goble, Alan. The Complete Index to Literary Sources in Film. Walter de Gruyter, 1999.

External links
 

1922 films
1922 drama films
1920s English-language films
American silent feature films
American mystery films
American black-and-white films
Films directed by Charles Giblyn
1920s American films
Silent mystery films